Sir Henry James "Harry" Pearce, KBE (born 1 November 1953) is a fictional character, head of the counter-terrorism department ("Section D") of MI5 as featured in the British television series Spooks. He was played by Peter Firth during the whole run of the series from 2002 to 2011, and reprised for the 2015 film, Spooks: The Greater Good.

Career

Prior career
After attending the University of Oxford, Pearce went to the Royal Military Academy Sandhurst before joining the Light Blue Dragoons. Upon leaving the army, he joined MI5, where he completed his training in June 1977. His first assignment at the service was to A Section, in Northern Ireland, where he was an agent handler during the Provisional IRA's campaign against the British state, until his close colleague Bill Crombie was kidnapped and killed in August 1978. Pearce was then seconded to the Secret Intelligence Service (aka MI6), where he was stationed in Paris, under Juliet Shaw. During this time he worked in Iran, where he had an affair with Shaw. His wife Jane's discomfort in Paris led the couple to move to Cologne before the end of February 1979. In Cologne, he worked against the left-wing terrorists, the Red Army Faction, and undertook a black op with only C's knowledge, before his secondment ended in November 1979.

On his return to MI5, Pearce was assigned to Section D, the counter-terrorism department (then at Gower Street), where he was a junior field officer. During his time as an officer, he saved the lives of two Prime Ministers (Thatcher and Major). Pearce was promoted to senior field officer between October 1986 and December 1988, and appointed to his current role in January 1994

As Head of Section D
In Episode 2 of Series 7, Harry, through Lucas North, manages to frame Arkady Kachimov, the FSB resident in London, as an MI5 mole. Under cover of providing him protection, Harry and Ros meet with him, but Harry shoots Kachimov in revenge for the death of Adam Carter.

In Episode 3 of Series 7, Harry learned from Lucas North that Russian intelligence interrogated him about an operation called Sugarhorse. Harry contacts his mentor, Bernard Qualtrough, a retired spy to consult him about who could have been a mole within this highly classified operation.

In Episode 8 of Series 7, after negotiating with the head of FSB operations in London to not kill his officers as they attempt to defuse a nuclear bomb about to obliterate central London, he is captured and shown with his mouth taped and being zipped up in a body bag, with a helicopter in the background.

In Episode 1 of Series 8, Harry is being held by a group of Russians who plan to sell him to a group of rogue elements of the Indian Secret Service, of the CIA and of MI6. The Russians are killed by the rogue officers and Harry is also apparently killed. The team find a video of his killing on the Internet but refuse to believe he is dead. Harry is interrogated by the officers about uranium weapons that he stole from them in Baghdad. The plan was to use these weapons to justify the war in Iraq, but Harry went rogue to stop them. He hid the uranium and told only one officer at MI5 about the uranium's location: Ruth Evershed. Harry and a captured Ruth once again meet, and their kidnappers use Ruth's new family to try to get them to reveal the location of the uranium. Ruth tells them but they shoot her husband. It is revealed that they had already checked the location she gave and that it wasn't there. Harry is the only person who really knows where the uranium is. Refusing to tell them, the officer threatens to kill Ruth, but is instead killed by Lucas before he can kill Ruth. Back on the Grid, Malcolm, who went out of his way to save Ruth's stepson, tells Harry that he wants to retire. Though reluctant at first, he accepts and Malcolm leaves MI5.

In Episode 2 of Series 8, Nicholas Blake, the Home Secretary, comes to Harry and tells him that he was informed of a secret meeting in Basel between rogue elements of Western and Eastern intelligence services, including the CIA and MI6. Harry and Blake start to plan for the downfall of the meeting's plans for a new world order.

Harry meets with Samuel Walker, the head of the CIA in London, to discuss this threat. Both suspect that a CIA agent is involved in the conspiracy. Walker is later killed by Sarah Caufield, Lucas North's girlfriend and the CIA mole. Along with Ruth, Harry tries to discover who killed Walker and find out more about the meeting in Basel.

During the investigation of a British bank supposedly planning to make a profit out of the UK's crashing economy, Harry and Ruth discover that the conspiracy, codenamed Nightingale, own an account in that bank worth 6 billion dollars. They also discover that Nightingale is framing the Home Secretary as doing dodgy deals with the Mafia. He is forced to resign, leaving Section D alone to fight Nightingale.

In the series 8 finale, Nightingale has pushed India and Pakistan into a state of near-war. The commander-in-chief of the Pakistani army, General Ali, is a Nightingale asset and is planning an unofficial hardliner seizure of power. As the two different factions meet to discuss peace in London, Harry works to try to save the talks that are being threatened by Sarah Caulfield and Russel Price, head of the CIA in Europe and Sarah's Nightingale handler. After capturing Sarah, Harry sends Ros and Lucas to the hotel where the Home Secretary is meeting with the Pakistani President. Lucas manages to save the President and Harry makes him appear before the TV crew to show Nightingale that they failed. However, Ros and the Home Secretary are still in the building when a bomb blows up.

In the first episode of series 9, shortly after Ros's funeral, Ruth shows Harry a file that places Nicholas Blake at the meeting in Basel and being a member of Nightingale's inner circle, one of its highest-ranking members. His forced resignation was a smoke screen so that he wouldn't be suspected of being a part of Nightingale. It was he who had ordered the attack against the hotel. Furious at the betrayal of the man he thought of as a friend, Harry goes to his home in Scotland and poisons him.

Family
In Series 3, Pearce was revealed to be divorced, with two children. It had been previously mentioned that he had not told his wife what his profession was until their wedding day (15 June 1977). He met his wife, Jane, an English teacher, during their studies at Oxford. They had a daughter, Catherine, on 25 April 1980, followed by a son, Graham, on 18 June 1983, before "Jane filed for divorce, citing irreconcilable differences" in October 1986. At some point between the divorce and her on-screen appearance, his daughter Catherine changed her surname to her mother's maiden name, Townsend. It is also stated in Series 7 Episode 7 that Jane suffered from depression.

While his ex-wife and son have never appeared on screen, Pearce's daughter, portrayed by Caroline Carver, appeared in Series 3, Episode 4 — at the start of the episode he regarded her as emotional and as one to "spot a bird with a broken wing", but in the course of the episode's events, he shows how deeply he cares for her and has grown to respect her intelligence. At the beginning of the same episode, Pearce mentions that "it was her brother who got the brains", although it is stated later in the episode that this brother, Graham, has not succeeded in life. It is also stated in Series 7 Episode 7 that Graham suffered a drug addiction.

In Series 9 episode 8, Harry calls Catherine and leaves a message. It is evident that this is his first contact for a while and that he knew she would be teaching a class and would not answer. He calmly and warmly suggests meeting for dinner soon and says that he knows she "looks out for" her brother – for whom he has no number "at the moment" – and that he would like to see more of them both. He is, in fact, on his way to a rendezvous with rogue agent Lucas North and expecting that he will die.

In Series 10 Episode 1, Harry explained to Ruth that during the time he was stationed in Berlin during the Cold War he had an affair with Elena Gavrik, the wife of former KGB officer and now Russian Minister Ilya Gavrik. Both Elena and Ilya had been called to the UK for talks about the new relationship between the two countries after Harry's tribunal (the reason he was called back to the Grid at the beginning of the episode) and they had brought their son, FSB officer Sasha Gavrik, with them as part of their protection programme.  Sasha, knowing his mother is a former western spy, suspects Harry may still be running her as an MI5 asset and demands he break all contact with Elena.
After confessing to Ruth at the end of the episode that he and Elena had been lovers, Ruth suggests taking Sasha Gavrik out of action in order to protect Elena from being revealed as a former MI5 asset, but Harry refuses and reveals to Ruth the reason behind this is that not only were he and Elena lovers, but that Sasha Gavrik is also their son. However, in episode 6, Elena reveals she has tricked Harry and Sasha is indeed Ilya's son.

Relationships

Ruth Evershed
Harry had an ongoing relationship with Ruth Evershed, another one of the main characters. Over the years, it appears that they formed a strong bond. In Series 4, the two became closer, forming a good working relationship as well as an unsaid personal connection.
At the very beginning of series 5, he realized that he was in love with her. Their relationship was brought to a head in series 5, when he worked up the courage to ask her to dinner. However, Ruth, upset by what her colleagues thought of the relationship, called it off at the end of the episode.

Two episodes later, Ruth is set up after a conspiracy against Harry forces her to sacrifice her freedom to save him. With the help of her Section D colleague Ruth fakes her death and is forced to leave the country and the series. During their final goodbye Harry was about to reveal his love to Ruth, but she urged him to leave things unsaid. They then kiss and she leaves. Ruth finally returns to the UK in series eight after she and her new family are targeted over information only she and Harry were privy to. Their reunion was tainted by the killing of Ruth's new partner and the almost sacrifice of her young step son and Harry and Ruth's relationship became cold. Since she has returned to the grid, her feelings toward him however seem to have thawed.

In Series 9 Episode 1, Harry asked Ruth to marry him after Ros's funeral service. Ruth declines, saying that their timing was always the problem.  After this she quickly goes back into their professional relationship, revealing that the former Home Secretary Nicholas Blake was involved in the Nightingale Conspiracy and was connected to Ros's death.

At the end of the episode, Ruth tells Harry the reason she turned his proposal down was not because she didn't love him but that she felt that after so many years together they didn't need to display their feelings in such a way.

In Series 9 Episode 8, after the revelation about Lucas North, Lucas proceeds to kidnap Ruth and threaten to kill her unless Harry delivers "Albany" a deadly State secret.  Harry retrieves Albany and trades it for Ruth's freedom. At the end of the episode, she questions him over his decision, little realising that Albany is a fake and isn't a threat to National Security. Harry is then told by the Home Secretary that an investigation is to take place into his entire career and is asked to prepare for life after MI5.

In Episode 1 of Series 10, during the tribunal, it is revealed that Albany was indeed a fake.
Harry defends his decision to trade Albany for Ruth's life as it wasn't a threat to national security and that Ruth was more valuable to the nation than a worthless piece of technology. He has also prepared a report on Ruth which catches the attention of Home Secretary William Towers.

In the same episode Harry asks Ruth to be his escort at the Russian reception while trying to talk to former Russian spy and MI5 asset Elena Gavrik who is in the UK with her husband, Russian Minister Ilya Gavrik. During Episode 1 their son, Sasha Gavrik comes across information that suggests Harry has been running Elena as an MI5 asset. He threatens Harry, asking him to cut off all contact with Elena.
Harry tells his team about Elena's involvement as an MI5 asset during the Cold War. Elena has been receiving messages from an impersonator claiming to be Harry. He tells Ruth, who agrees to help him in revealing who has been posing as him.
During the Russian Reception, someone attempts to assassinate Ilya Gavrik. Harry manages to contact Elena, asking for them to meet in private.
At the end of the episode Harry reveals to Ruth that he and Elena had been lovers, and that Sasha Gavrik is their son.

In episode 2 he tells her she's the only one he can turn to as no one else other than CIA agent Jim Coaver knows about Sasha, but then as a result Harry and Ruth seemingly become cold towards each other with a clash of opinions at Harry's reluctance to talk about Sasha and after he asks her to investigate Coaver.

In Episode 3 Harry asks Ruth to meet with former lover Elena Gavrik to collect the messages sent to her by his impersonator.
Despite being reluctant Ruth goes to meet Elena, who makes it clear she is already aware of Harry's feelings for Ruth.

Ruth  is also offered the position of Security Advisor to the Home Secretary but decides not to make a choice as she needs to speak to Harry about it first before considering the position.
In Episode 4, after suspecting Jim Coaver may be behind the recent attacks in both MI5 and Ilya Gavrik, Harry attempts to gain evidence against him with Ruth's help by using Elena Gavrik as bait to draw him out.
However the operation goes horribly wrong and Elena is attacked, when an assassin (previously seen in episode 1 and working for the CIA) attempts to shoot at her. She misses and Elena is left clinging to Harry in shock, however Ruth then sees this, and assumes that Harry could potentially still be in love with Elena causing her to doubt his judgment as well as leading to Harry doubting himself.

At the end of the episode Ruth and Harry discuss their past. She questions whether or not she truly knows him. He tells her she knows the important things which she answers with "People don't love each other on a need to know basis". Harry is left contemplating.

She asks him if there are any more secrets, he tells her the truth admitting there are many more things in his past the remain a secret from her. Ruth proceeds to tell Harry about the job offer from the Home Secretary and asks for his opinion on whether or not she should leave.
Harry urges her to go, and to leave straight away, not because he wants her to leave but because he doesn't want her involved in what's coming.

In Episode 5 Ruth is no longer working with Harry in Section D but is instead working for the Home Secretary making the tension between then even more strained when she questions his motives about Jim Coaver and believes he is still in love with Elena Gavrik. Harry though determined to prove Jim is impersonating him and attacking the Gavriks and MI5 proceeds to interrogate Coaver despite Ruth's concerns.

During episode Elena meets Harry at an MI5 safehouse where he tells her he suspects her husband Ilya Gavrik of attacking the partnership, responsible for Tariq's death, attacking Ilya and MI5 and impersonating him. She outwardly refuses to believe him and they discuss their past, when he had attempted to extract both her and Sasha from Berlin at Treptower Park, before Coaver had stopped him. Elena then asks Harry to kiss her to which he refuses.

Later Harry meets Ruth, they discuss Jim Coaver's death and Harry explains to her that he does not feel love for Elena but instead feels guilt. He warns Ruth guilt can look like love which later leads to her questioning him if all he feels for her is guilt as well, but makes it clear that he is no longer in love with Elena. He also explains that he tried to extract Elena and Sasha from Berlin and he feels guilty mostly towards Sasha.
Harry then admits the reason he didn't tell Ruth about Elena was through shame of his own cowardice and Ruth indirectly admits in return that she was jealous of his relationship with Elena.

By the end of the episode Harry is suspected of being involved in the killing of Jim Coaver and is handed over to CIA due to his role in Coaver's death, Towers and Ruth meet him on the South Bank. Harry accepts the terms of the CIA and prepares to be extradited but will leave on the condition that the deal with Russia be brought forward to that afternoon to avoid more deaths.
Towers agrees and then leaves Harry and Ruth alone. 
Ruth tells him that she has put in an offer on a house in Suffolk but that she can't actually picture herself living there. Harry encourages her that she'll keep trying and to do as much as she can to cling on to the idea of a normal life. He then kisses her goodbye, but she is reluctant to let him go. He says her that they can pretend this isn't the end for them. 
A tearful Ruth is then left standing on the beach alone.

In episode 6 Harry is still in the custody of the CIA when Elena Gavrik informs Ruth she has intel about an attack planned on the UK.
Ruth asks for the help of her former colleagues in Section D who break Harry out of being extradited to the US.
Harry questions Elena who reveals someone is en route from Russia on a suicide mission.

Elena then also reveals that she had been a double agent all along for the Russians, recruited by a faction within the KGB (The Russian Secret Service) and that she had attempted to turn Harry but he was deemed too good. When Harry asks she also tells him that she lied to him and that Sasha is not his son but is Ilya Gavriks.

Ruth also questions Elena about her true motives, not entirely convinced that she is telling the truth.
Harry pushes Elena to break when he attacks Sasha, and Elena is left to make a choice between her son and her country.
Eventually they find out that Elena had been lying to them all along and that she had wanted the UK to fire at a Plane of innocent people, which would cause a destructive event, enough for the partnership deal to be deemed worthless and start conflict between Britain and Russia.

Later Ilya Gavrik asks Ruth to give him the key to Elena's cell, he then kills her to which Sasha witnesses and attempts to stop, but before he can get to his mother she is strangled.

Sasha out of revenge, goes out after Ruth and Harry realising that one of them had given Ilya the key.

The threat is over, the plane is safe and Ruth meets Harry outside. Going back on her words in episodes 4 and 5, she tells him they are made of secrets and then asks him to leave the Service with her and he agrees.

Sasha then appears with a shard of glass (Seen earlier after Ilya had strangled Elena)
Harry tells Ruth to move aside and return to the bunker. 
She refuses and instead stands in front of him to protect him trying to convince Sasha that it was her who gave Ilya the key to Elena's cell.
But as she tries to stop Sasha advancing towards Harry, he accidentally stabs her with the glass shard before Dimitri shoots him in the leg.
Ruth collapses in Harry's arms.

Harry tells his team to get help while he is left with Ruth dying in his arms. Both Harry and Erin try to calm Ruth out of shock and insist that Harry keep her talking.
She tells him she couldn't imagine living in Suffolk alone, but only ever living there with him. He tries to comfort her, telling her they will have a life there but before Dimitri, Erin and Calum can to her she's already gone, 
Dimitri tries to save her but it's too late. Calum asks Dimitri and Erin allow Harry to be alone with Ruth leaving Harry grieving, holding her.
Before he leaves he kisses her goodbye.

At the very end of the episode Harry visits the memorial naming every MI5 officer he has lost which now includes Ruth's name. He then returns to MI5 to work and Section D continues.

Honours
In Series 6, Episode 3, Harry receives a letter from 10 Downing Street, informing him that The Queen wished to bestow a knighthood upon him.  He already held a CBE, the honour immediately below that of the Knight Commander of the Order of the British Empire he now holds.

Reception
This character is considered by many fans to be the pillar of the show, providing both a backbone to the team and is often the cause of many of the comic relief situations present in the series, most notably in his exchanges during series 1 with Jools Siviter, played by Hugh Laurie. Another comic theme includes Harry getting annoyed every time someone would enter his office without knocking. This grew so much that in the series three finale, when Ruth came to warn him that something was wrong, Harry guessed it because she had knocked. He is well respected by his colleagues.  He has thus far survived four cliffhangers where it appears he is about to be killed (series 2, series 4, series 7 and series 9) and the tenth series is a plotline that revolves around Harry; his past and his relationship with Ruth.

He is the only character to have appeared in every single episode in the show.

Benji Wilson of The Daily Telegraph in describing Harry and Ruth's relationship commented that "(Ruth's) scenes with Peter Firth, another fine player, have become self-contained little bubbles of weltschmerz within every recent episode".

References

Television characters introduced in 2002
Spooks (TV series) characters
Fictional secret agents and spies
Fictional knights
Fictional English people